The ethnic groups in the Middle East in the 'transcontinental' region commonly known with its geopolitical term; the Middle East which includes Western Asia and areas close to West Asia such as Egypt and Cyprus. The region has historically been a crossroad of different cultures and languages. Since the 1960s, the changes in political and economic factors (especially the enormous oil wealth in the region and conflicts) have significantly altered the ethnic composition of groups in the region. While some ethnic groups have been present in the region for millennia, others have arrived fairly recently through immigration. The largest socioethnic groups in the region are Arabs, Jewry, Kurds, Persians, Turks Georgians, Armenians, and Azerbaijanis but there are dozens of other ethnic groups which have hundreds of thousands, if not millions, of members.

Other indigenous, religious, or long-standing minority ethnic groups include: Arameans, Assyrians, Armenians, Bahrani ,  Baloch, Coptic Christians, Cappadocian Greeks, Cypriots, Druze, Gilaks, Greeks, Jews, Kawliya, Laz, Lurs, Mandaeans, Maronites, Mazanderanis, Mhallami, Nawar, Pontic Greeks, Rûm Christians, Jews, Samaritans, Shabaks, Talysh, Tats, Kurds and Zazas.

Diaspora ethnic groups living in the region include: Albanians, Bengalis, Britons, Bosniaks, Chinese, Circassians, Crimean Tatars, Jews,  Filipinos, French people, Georgians, Indians, Jews, Indonesians, Kawliya, Italians, Malays, Malayali, Pakistanis, Pashtuns, Punjabis, Romani, Sikhs, Sindhis, Somalis, Sri Lankans, Turkmens, and Sub-Saharan Africans.

Demographics

Middle East
Arabs
Alawites
Algerians
Bahranis
Bahrainis
Egyptians (noting that many Coptic Christians openly reject Arab identity, even though Arabized)
Emiratis
Hadhrami
Iraqis (including the Marsh Arabs but excluding ethnic minorities like the Armenians, Assyrians, Circassians, Kawliya, Kurds, Mandaeans, Shabaks, Turkmen, and Yazidis)
Jordanians (excluding ethnic minorities like the Armenians, Circassians, and Kurds)
Kuwaitis
Lebanese (excluding some Christians, especially Maronites, who instead claim a Phoenician identity, and ethnic minorities like the Armenians, Assyrians, and Kurds)
Libyans
Mehri
Moroccans
Omanis
Palestinians
Qataris
Saudis
Solluba
Syrians (excluding ethnic minorities like the Arameans, Armenians, Assyrians, Circassians, Kurds, Nawar–Roma, Turkmen, and Yazidis)
Tunisians
Yemenis

Sub-Saharan Africans
Nubians
Afro-Iraqis
Afro-Jordanians
Sudanese in Israel

Jews
Israeli Jews
Ashkenazi Jews
Ethiopian Jews
Mizrahi Jews
Sephardi Jews
Samaritans

Syriac-speaking peoples
Arameans
Arameans in Israel
Arameans in Syria
Assyrians
Assyrians in Armenia
Assyrians in Georgia
Assyrians in Iran
Assyrians in Iraq
Assyrians in Israel
Assyrians in Jordan
Assyrians in Lebanon
Assyrians in Syria
Assyrians in Turkey
Mandaeans
Mhallami

Indo-European peoples
Albanians
Albanians in Egypt
Albanians in Syria
Armenians
Armenians in the Middle East
Armenians in Egypt
Armenians in Iran
Armenians in Iraq
Armenians in Israel
Armenians in Lebanon
Armenians in Syria
Armenians in Turkey
Greeks
Greek Cypriots
Greeks in Egypt
Greeks in Israel
Greeks in Lebanon
Greeks in Syria
Iranian peoples
Ajam of Bahrain
Ajam of Iraq
Kurds
Shabaks
Yazidis
Italians
Levantines
Italian Egyptians
Italians in Lebanon
Romani
Dom
Kawliya
Nawar–Romani people in Syria
Romani people in Egypt

Turkic peoples
Azerbaijanis
Iraqi Turkmen
Syrian Turkmen
Turks in Egypt
Turks in Israel
Turks in Jordan
Turks in Lebanon

Anatolia

Indo-European peoples
Armenians in Turkey
Greeks in Turkey
Cappadocian Greeks
Pontic Greeks
Levantines
Iranian peoples
Kurds in Turkey
Romani
Dom
Romani people in Turkey
Zazas
Kartvelian peoples
Georgians in Turkey
Laz people in Turkey
Semites
Arabs in Turkey
Assyrians in Turkey
Jews in Turkey
Turkic peoples
Azerbaijanis in Turkey
Crimean Tatars in Turkey
Turks
Muhacir
Muslims from the Caucasus (Peoples of the Caucasus in Turkey)
Muslims from the Balkans (mainly Albanians, Bosniaks, and Pomaks)

Cyprus

Armenians in Cyprus
Greek Cypriots
Maronite Cypriots
Turkish Cypriots

Iranian Plateau

Indo-European peoples
Armenians in Iran
Iranian peoples
Persians
Baloch
Kurds in Iran
Feylis
Kaka'is
Kurds of Khorasan
Laks
Gilaks
Lurs
Mazanderanis
Talysh
Tats
Kartvelian peoples
Georgians in Iran
Semites
Arabs in Iran
Assyrians in Iran
Jews in Iran
Persian Jews
Mandaeans
Turkic peoples
Azerbaijanis in Iran
Qashqai
Turkmen in Iran
Peoples of the Caucasus in Iran

Diaspora populations

Because of the low population of many of the Arab States of the Persian Gulf and the demand for labor created by the large discoveries of oil in these countries there has been a steady stream of immigration to the region (mainly from South Asia). Ethnic groups which comprise the largest portions of this immigration include Afghans, Bengalis, Britons, Chinese, Filipinos, Indians, Indonesians, Malays, Nepalis, Pakistanis, Punjabis, Sikhs, Sindhis, Somalis, Sri Lankans, and Sub-Saharan Africans. Many of these people are denied certain political and legal rights in the countries in which they live and frequently face mistreatment by the native-born citizens of the host countries.

See also

Arab diaspora
Arab world
Armenian diaspora
Assyrian diaspora
Demographics of the Arab League
Demographics of the Middle East
Ethnic groups in Asia
Ethnic groups in Europe
Genetic history of the Middle East
Iranian diaspora
Iranian peoples
Jewish diaspora
Jews
Peoples of the Caucasus
Semitic people
South Asian ethnic groups
Turkic peoples

References